is a Japanese alpine skier. He competed at the 1992, 1994, and 1998 Winter Olympics.

References

External links
 Official JOC profile 

1971 births
Living people
Japanese male alpine skiers
Olympic alpine skiers of Japan
Alpine skiers at the 1992 Winter Olympics
Alpine skiers at the 1994 Winter Olympics
Alpine skiers at the 1998 Winter Olympics
Sportspeople from Aomori Prefecture
20th-century Japanese people